Singapore is governed as a unitary state without provinces or states. However, for the purposes of administration and urban planning, it has been subdivided in various ways throughout its history.

History
Historically, these subdivisions have been based on postal districts, especially during the colonial era. When local elections necessitated the setting up of electoral districts, however, it began to supplement postal districts as an alternative form of local governance, since each electoral district is headed by a member of parliament who represents and speaks for the respective electorates.

Administrative and Electoral Divisions

Community Development Council Districts

Established in 1997 by the PA Act, there were 9 districts formerly, governed by 9 different Community Development Councils (CDCs). In 2001, the 9 districts and CDCs were then reformed into 5, namely the North East CDC, North West CDC, South East CDC, South West CDC and Central Singapore CDC. Each district is then further divided into electoral constituencies and town councils.

The council boundaries follow that of the existing political divisions, with each handling between four and six GRCs and SMCs and roughly dividing the country's population into equal parts. Each CDC is managed by a Council, which in turn is headed by a mayor and has between 12 and 80 members. The members are appointed by the Chairman or Deputy Chairman of the People's Association.

The role of the CDCs is to initiate, plan and manage community programmes to promote community bonding and social cohesion within local communities. The electoral boundaries of Singapore are relatively fluid, and are reviewed prior to each general election. The districts are composed of the constituencies and electoral districts (the latter as of the 2015 General Elections).

There are currently five CDCs, namely the
Central Singapore Community Development Council
North East Community Development Council
North West Community Development Council
South East Community Development Council
South West Community Development Council

Town councils

The first town councils were set up in September 1986 by the Town Councils Act, with the main purpose of estate management. Prior to the introduction of town councils, housing estates were managed by the Housing Development Board. As the estates were centrally managed, the standardised rules that the board had set for all housing estates made HDB towns monotonous in appearance and problems faced by residents in the different estates were not addressed fast enough.

Town councils boundaries are drawn based on electoral district boundaries. A town council area can consist of a Group Representation Constituency (GRC), a Single Member Constituency (SMC), or a collection of neighbouring GRCs and SMCs controlled by the same political party. The Members of Parliament head the town councils of their constituencies. Town councils boundaries do not correspond to new town boundaries; different parts of the same HDB town may be managed by different town councils.

There are currently 17 town councils as of 2020:

Constituencies 

Town councils are then further subdivided into different constituencies, which are classified as either Single Member Constituencies (SMCs) or Group Representation Constituencies (GRCs). The boundaries of the electoral constituencies are decided by the Elections Department, which is under the control of the Prime Minister's Office.

Other administrative subdivisions

URA Master Plan boundaries

Regions

The five regions of Singapore are groupings of the planning areas.

Planning Areas

In the 1990s, the Urban Redevelopment Authority carved up the country into 55 of planning areas. The Singapore Department of Statistics adopted these boundaries for the latest 2000 nationwide population census, and the Singapore Police Force uses them as an approximate guide when demarcating boundaries for its Neighbourhood Police Centres.

Survey Districts
Singapore is divided into 64 survey districts, of which 34 are mukims (originally, rural districts) and 30 are town subdivisions.

Postal Districts
Postal districts were numbered from 01 to 83 under the new system implemented on 1 September 1995. Census data and most forms of internal boundaries had been based on postal districts until the introduction of new planning boundaries in the 1990s.

See also
List of places in Singapore

References

External links
CDC Districts 
Singapore Land Registry 

 
Singapore
Singapore geography-related lists
Singapore
Urban planning in Singapore
Singapore